Sandbach Town Council is a town council for the Cheshire Market Town of Sandbach. It which was established in 1974 as a successor council to the Sandbach Urban District Council. It comprises 20 councillors elected every four years. Meetings are held at the Sandbach Town Hall complex.

Mayor
The current mayor, Cllr Kathryn Flavel, was elected to the seat of Mayor for 2022/23. Her charities include Sandbach Animal Rescue and Cheshire Arts for Health.

References

Town Councils in Cheshire
Local precepting authorities in England
Town Council